William J. Fishman (1 April 1921 – 22 December 2014) was a British historian and academic. He was the author of several books on topics ranging from revolutionary advocacy in Europe during the late 19th and early 20th centuries to the history of the East End of London.  He has been defined as a "libertarian Socialist."

Early life and education 
Fishman was born in London in 1921. The son of an immigrant tailor from Russia and his Ukrainian wife, he spent his formative years in the East End of London.  At 15, he was an eyewitness to the Battle of Cable Street, and recalled:

I was moved to tears to see bearded Jews and Irish Catholic dockers standing up to stop Mosley. I shall never forget that as long as I live, how working-class people could get together to oppose the evil of fascism.

In his 1975 book "Jewish Radicals: From Czarist Stetl to London Ghetto" Fishman described how Communists in Britain such as Aaron Liebermann, Morris Winchevsky, Woolf Wess, and others, were "an arm of underground Russia" at the same time they promoted unionism (syndicalism) in the United Kingdom.

He was educated at the Central Foundation Boys' School, Wandsworth Teachers Training College and the London School of Economics, and taught history at Morpeth School, Bethnal Green. He also served as Principal at Bethnal Green Junior Commercial College, an institution focused on the provision of evening classes.

Career 
He was awarded a Schoolmaster Fellowship at Balliol College Oxford, before becoming visiting professor of history at the University of Wisconsin, Madison from 1969–70 and was awarded an Acton Society Fellowship. In 1972 he was appointed Barnet Shine Senior Research Fellow in Labour Studies with special reference to Jews at Queen Mary, University of London. He was made an honorary fellow of Queen Mary in 1999. He was Visiting Professor to the Centre for the Study of Migration at Queen Mary. In conjunction with the class “Politics and Society in East London,”  he led a guided tour of the East End, and particularly the Ripper’s path, which was fondly known as “Fishmania.”

On 22 December 2014, he died at the age of 93.

Books
  The Insurrectionists (1970); Publ: Methuen
 East End Jewish Radicals 1875–1914 (1974); Publ: Duckworth
The Streets of East London (1979) (with photographs by Nicholas Breach);
 East End 1888: Life in a London Borough Among the Labouring Poor (1988); Publ: Duckworth
East End and Docklands (1990) (with Nicholas Breach and John Martin Hall); Publ: Duckworth
 Into The Abyss: The Life and Work of G. R. Sims (2008); Publ: Elliott & Thompson

References

Further reading

External links
Centre for the Study of Migration, Queen Mary, University of London
biography Museum of Childhood
 

1921 births
2014 deaths
Academics from London
People educated at Central Foundation Boys' School
British Jews
University of Wisconsin–Madison faculty
Alumni of the London School of Economics
Academics of Queen Mary University of London
Columbia University faculty